Australian indie pop singer Vance Joy, has released three studio albums, one live album, one extended play and nineteen singles.

Albums

Studio albums

Live albums

Extended plays

Singles

Other charted and certified songs

Guest appearances

Music videos

Notes

References

External links
 
 
 

Discography
Discographies of Australian artists